Fika-Patso Dam is a combined earth-fill/rock-fill type dam located on the Namahadi River, the uppermost section of the Elands River, a tributary of the Wilge River.

It is located near Phuthaditjhaba, Free State, South Africa. It was established in 1986 and its primary purpose is water for domestic and industrial usage.

See also
List of reservoirs and dams in South Africa
List of rivers of South Africa

References 

Dams in South Africa
Dams completed in 1987